is a rail shooter video game developed and published by HAL Laboratory for the Super Nintendo Entertainment System (SNES). It used the SNES' Mode 7 capability.

Gameplay

HyperZone is a rail shooter game. The object of the game is to navigate each level while shooting enemies and earning points until encountering a boss enemy, at the end of each level. After enough points are acquired, the player earns an extend and their ship is upgraded at the beginning of the next stage. The player's ship can receive up to six upgrades.

As a racing game, the resemblance is visual. The mode 7 tracks are similar to the well-known progenitor of mode 7 racing, F-Zero. As a scrolling shooter, it is also similar to Star Fox in that the player's ship is constantly pushed forward through each level. While it is possible to slow down, doing so gradually causes damage to the player's ship.

HyperZone contains eight levels. After the initial game is finished, it restarts from the beginning with the player continuing in their final ship and keeping score; the game loops infinitely.

Synopsis 
The game is set in the year 2089, where Earth has become unable to support life due to humankind's ignorance. The Earth Council has turned their attention to the asteroid belt between Mars and Jupiter - a place virtually untouched by civilization. But a hostile race of cybernetic beings has taken up residence there, and if humankind is to survive, the infestation must be eradicated...

Development and release 
HyperZone has a resemblance to Eliminator, a game released for the Amiga and various 8-bit computers. The game's perspective and its unusual landscapes were inspired by the "Star Gate" sequence of 2001: A Space Odyssey. The offtrack landscape in the Material Factory (Area 1 in the US/European version, Area 3 in the Japanese version) is a tessellation of flashing tetrominos that resemble those in Tetris; the boss in Area 3 resembles the right part of the SNES controller, and buttons—of the same four colors as the Japanese and PAL region SNES logo—circle around it. Another HAL game, Kirby's Dream Land 3, references this game: The final area in the game is called Hyperzone, and several other areas share names.

Stereoscopic 3D support was partially added, but is not enabled unless the user enters a cheat code on the gamepad. It is supposed it requires LCD shutter glasses, or perhaps future programming to enable anaglyph.

Regional differences

The Japanese version is called Hyper Zone, and its logotypes in and out of the game differ from those in the western version. Levels 1 and 3 underwent a graphics swap between the two versions: the level layout and enemy positioning (aside from each boss encounter) is still the same, but the graphics set and background music are different. It is unknown why this was done because levels 1 and 3 have bosses that do not fit into their respective color schemes in the western versions.

Reception 

According to Nintendo Power, HyperZone proved to be a top selling game in Japan. Entertainment Weekly gave the game an "A" rating, summarizing, "With lots of practice, you can learn to forestall annihilation, but when you finally blow up (and believe me, you will finally blow up), it's like reliving every grisly driver's-ed film you saw in high school."

Notes

References

External links 
 HyperZone at GameFAQs
 HyperZone at Giant Bomb
 HyperZone at MobyGames

1991 video games
HAL Laboratory games
Rail shooters
Science fiction video games
Super Nintendo Entertainment System games
Super Nintendo Entertainment System-only games
Video games developed in Japan
Video games set in the 2080s